Condé-sur-Noireau is a former commune in the Calvados department in the Normandy region in northwestern France. On 1 January 2016, it was merged into the new commune of Condé-en-Normandie. It is situated on the  River. In the fifteenth century, the town was occupied by the English, and belonged to Sir John Fastolf of Caister Castle in Norfolk (1380-1459). It was from here that the Spanish mercenary François de Surienne launched an attack on Fougères in Brittany, which triggered the invasion of English Normandy by Charles VII of France, and the end of the Hundred Years' War.

Population

International relations
The commune is twinned with:
 Ross-on-Wye, UK since 1978.
 Poggio Rusco, Italy since 2000.

See also
Communes of the Calvados department

References

 Stephen Cooper, The Real Falstaff, Sir John Fastolf and the Hundred Years War,  (Pen & Sword, 2010)

Former communes of Calvados (department)
Calvados communes articles needing translation from French Wikipedia
Populated places disestablished in 2016